Terry Butler is an American bassist who currently performs with the death metal bands Obituary and Inhuman Condition. He was also a member of Six Feet Under, Massacre and Death. He was credited on the Death album Spiritual Healing, and band leader Chuck Schuldiner stated that on the latter Death album "Terry contributed to the songwriting as well".

He is married with three children, and is brother-in-law of former bandmate Greg Gall.

Before he joined Six Feet Under, he was in Massacre with Rick Rozz, whom he played with in Leprosy-era Death. In an interview, Butler has stated: "I'd rather be popular in the underground, than be unknown in the mainstream."

In late 2011 it was announced that Butler was reforming Massacre with former bandmate Rick "Rozz" DeLillo, with the intention of securing a record deal, recording a new album, and international touring. The band performed on the cruise ship "70,000 Tons of Metal" in January 2012 and subsequently signed a worldwide recording agreement with Century Media Records. Terry has also agreed to join the all star guest list on the upcoming Vegas Rhythm Kings album Barrel O' Zombies.

Discography

Death
Leprosy (1988) (credited, but does not play)
Spiritual Healing (1990)

Massacre
From Beyond (1991)
Inhuman Condition (1992)
Back from Beyond (2014)

Six Feet Under
 Haunted (1995)
 Alive and Dead (1996)
 Warpath (1997)
Maximum Violence (1999)
Graveyard Classics (2000)
True Carnage (2001)
Bringer of Blood (2003)
Graveyard Classics 2 (2004)
13 (2005)
Commandment (2007)
Death Rituals (2008)
Graveyard Classics 3 (2010)
Wake the Night! Live in Germany (2011)

Obituary
 Inked in Blood (2014)
Ten Thousand Ways to Die (2016)
 Obituary (2017)
 Dying of Everything (2023)

References

1967 births
20th-century American bass guitarists
American heavy metal bass guitarists
American male bass guitarists
Death (metal band) members
Guitarists from Florida
Living people
Massacre (metal band) members
Musicians from Tampa, Florida
Obituary (band) members
Six Feet Under (band) members
20th-century American male musicians